A flame is affected by the fuel introduced and the oxygen available. A flame with a balanced oxygen-fuel ratio is called a neutral flame. The color of a neutral flame is semi-transparent purple or blue. This flame is optimal for many uses because it does not oxidize or deposit soot onto surfaces.

Oxidizing flame 
If the flame has too much oxygen, an oxidizing flame is produced. When the amount of oxygen increases, the flame shortens due to quicker combustion, its color becomes a more transparent blue, and it hisses/roars. With some exceptions (e.g., platinum soldering in jewelry), the oxidizing flame is usually undesirable for welding and soldering, since, as its name suggests, it oxidizes the metal's surface.  The same principle is important in firing pottery.

Reducing flame 
A reducing flame is a flame with insufficient oxygen. It has a opaque yellow or orange color due to carbon or hydrocarbons which bind with (or reduce) the oxygen contained in the materials the flame processes. The flame is also called carburizing flame, since it tends to introduce carbon soot into the molten metal.

The flame also produces carbon monoxide, a toxic gas.

Reducing flames with no carbon 
Reducing zero-carbon fuel flames, such as reducing hydrogen flames, are exceptions. They don't have an opaque yellow or orange glow, nor do they produce soot or carbon monoxide.
This is because these flames do not produce carbon dioxide.

See also
 for further details about the above types of flame in oxy-fuel burners
Oxyhydrogen
Redox
Oxygen
Flame test
Spark testing

References

Fire